The Grom (meaning "thunder" in Polish) is a man-portable air-defense system produced in Poland and based on the Soviet man-portable infrared homing surface-to-air missile (SAM) 9K38 Igla. It consists of a 72 mm anti-aircraft missile set with a flight speed of 650 m/s, as well as a single-use launcher, re-usable gripstock and thermal battery coolant assembly electric unit. The full name of the system is PZR Grom, PZR standing for Przeciwlotniczy Zestaw Rakietowy (literally anti-air rocket-propelled set).

It is designed to target low-flying helicopters and aeroplanes. As such, the Grom missile is used by other surface-to-air defence systems of Polish design, including ZSU-23-4MP Biała, ZUR-23-2 kg and Poprad self-propelled artillery system. It should not to be confused with versions of the Zvezda Kh-23 air-to-surface missile built under licence in Yugoslavia/Serbia as the Grom-A and Grom-B.

History 

Initially at least since the 1970s the MESKO metal works in Skarżysko-Kamienna mass-produced license-built Soviet Strela-2M (SA-7 Grail) surface-to-air missiles, designated in Poland as Strzała-2M. However, when these became outdated in the late 1980s the lead designers prepared the works to produce a more modern Soviet design, the 9K38 Igla (SA-18 Grouse). However, Poland left the Soviet bloc in 1990 and the license was declined, thus leaving Poland with no modern MANPADS at hand.

Because of that, in late 1992 various Polish works and design bureaus (among them the Zielonka-based Military Institute of Armament Technology, the WAT Military University of Technology and the Skarżysko Rocket Design Bureau) started working on a new Igla-like design. These were allegedly helped by the Polish intelligence services able to buy the design plans of the original 9K38 Igla missile system in the LOMO works in Leningrad (modern St. Petersburg) during the turmoil following the dissolution of the Soviet Union. By 1995 the first batch (marked as GROM-1) entered service. It included a number of imported Russian components. By the late 1990s these were replaced with entirely Poland-designed elements.

On January 1, 2013, Bumar Amunicja manufactured their 2,000th Grom missile set.

Grom was later improved into what became known as the Piorun, with a new seeker and rocket motor.

Design 
The system is designed to be operated by one soldier. It consists of a single-stage projectile, a single-use tubular launcher, a starting mechanism, and an on-ground power supply. The rocket projectile uses solid propellant. The infrared aiming sensor is cooled with liquid nitrogen. There are options for identification friend or foe and thermovision.

Operational history
The 'Grom' has been used by Polish Land Forces since 1995.  It is also exported to other countries, including Georgia which bought 30 launchers and 100 missiles in 2007. According to press releases during the Russo-Georgian War, Polish-made GROM missiles targeted Russian planes and helicopters 20 times, 12 missiles were fired out of which 9 hit their targets, and most likely shot down a Su-25.

Indonesian Army bought around 152 Grom missiles as part of Kobra (Aster) V-SHORAD system, including four Poprad mobile launchers, 12 ZUR-23-2 kg-I launchers and 76 missiles delivered in 2007 and the second such system ordered in 2006.

In March 2012, Peru chose the winners of a $140 million competition meant to upgrade its air defence systems, choosing among others 50 Grom launchers and six Poprad mobile launchers. However, there have been no reports of the deal being finalized.

Political relevance 
In late 2008 Russian press claimed that Russian Army personnel had found Polish GROM missiles in Chechnya. Polish press immediately reacted accusing Russia of fabricating evidence which links Poland to that conflict, claiming that missiles were moved by Russians from Georgia to Chechnya.

Operators

Current operators
  - 30 launchers and 100+ missiles, were used in Russo-Georgian war.
  - in use as a part of Aster system.
  - acquired in 2014.
  - Around 400 launchers and 2000 missiles of Grom version, 400 missiles of Piorun version, 420 launchers and 1300 missiles of Piorun version on order.

Evaluation only
  - 1 launcher and 5 missiles, bought in 2010 for testing.
  - Captured unknown quantity of launchers in Georgia (One launcher was sent to the separatists in Ukraine).
  - purchased 120 missiles.

See also
 Anza (missile)
 Misagh-2
 Qaem
 FIM-92 Stinger
 Mistral (missile)
 Starstreak missile
 9K38 Igla
 RBS 70
 QW-3

References

External links 
 MESKO—Ammunition, Fuses, Primers and Missile Components—Producer site
 GROM MAn-Portable Air-Defense missile System MANPADS on armyrecognition.com

Guided missiles of Poland
20th-century surface-to-air missiles
21st-century surface-to-air missiles
Science and technology in Poland
Polish inventions
Military equipment introduced in the 1990s